Wyckoff-Mason House is a log house located at 6133 Verona Road in Penn Hills Township, Allegheny County, Pennsylvania, USA. It was built in 1774 and 1775 by Isaac Wyckoff. The house was added to the List of Pittsburgh History and Landmarks Foundation Historic Landmarks in 1970.

References

Houses in Allegheny County, Pennsylvania
Houses completed in 1775
Log buildings and structures in Pennsylvania
History of Allegheny County, Pennsylvania